Monowar Hossain Dipjol is a Bangladeshi actor, businessman, and former ward commissioner. He is a current vice-president of the Bangladesh Film Artists' Association.

Personal life 
Dipjol is married to Rumana Monowar.

Career 
Dipjol is a Dhallywood film actor, and owns Dipjol Food Industries Limited. He is best known for his style of dialogue and action. He is a supporter of the Bangladesh Nationalist Party, and was elected ward commissioner of Dhaka ward number 9 in 1994.

He was sentenced to jail in 2007 on an arms charge. He was later convicted of numerous charges, including amassing and concealing illegal wealth, and was given a 41-year term. According to an investigation by a team of the Jail Directorate led by Commander M Zakaria Khan, Deputy Inspector General of Prisons Shamsul Haider Siddique was found guilty of violating 15 codes of the jail in February 2009. He was found favoring convict Monowar Hossain Dipjol in prison and giving him special privilege such as allowing 200 visitors for Dipjol in 52 days. He was released after securing his bail from Bangladesh High court on 1 June 2009. 

In September 2017, he fell ill and after being taken to hospital was diagnosed as having had a heart attack and suffering from water on the lungs. He underwent heart surgery at Elizabeth Hospital in Singapore.

On 28 January 2022, Dipjol became a vice-president of the Bangladesh Film Artists' Association after bagging 219 votes. Masum Parvez Rubel also became.

Filmography

Web series

References

External links
 
 
 Dipjol on Bangla Movie Database

1958 births
Living people
Bangladeshi male film actors
Bangladesh Nationalist Party politicians
Bangladeshi film producers
Bangladeshi businesspeople
People from Dhaka